William Hasell Wilson (1811–1902) was a prominent American surveyor and civil engineer for both the Reading and Pennsylvania Railroads in the 19th century. Two of his sons, Joseph Miller Wilson (1838–1902) and Henry W. Wilson (1844–1910) went on to found Wilson Brothers & Company a prominent Victorian-era architecture and engineering firm established in Philadelphia, Pennsylvania, that was especially noted for its structural expertise.

Early life and works
Wilson was the resident engineer in charge for the 1835 Black Rock Tunnel, the second rail road tunnel constructed in the United States, and the oldest tunnel still in use.

Wilson was born in Charleston, South Carolina in 1811 to John Wilson (1789–1833) and Eliza Gibbes, his wife, daughter of William Hasell Gibbes of Charleston, South Carolina, and his wife, Elizabeth Allston, who was a half sister of Washington Allston, painter and poet. Wilson was a lineal descendant of the Allstons and Gibbes families, two of the oldest names which date back to the founding of the colony in the Seventeenth Century. On his father's side he was descended from a long line of civil engineers, and his father (Major John Wilson) was the Chief Engineer of the Pennsylvania State Railway.
Wilson married Jane Millers of Delaware Co., Pa., *(Born 26 April 1836, died. 11 May 1898)

He died in 1902 and was buried at Laurel hill cemetery in Philadelphia, Pennsylvania.

His son, Joseph Miller Wilson (1838–1902), was also a civil engineer for the Pennsylvania Railroad.

Works
Notes on the Philadelphia and Columbia Railroad, W. Hassell Wilson Journal of The Franklin Institute (May 1840), vol. 29, pp. 331–341.

 Reminiscences of a Railroad Engineer. Railroad World Publishing Company, 1896.

References

Sources
 3501 Powelton Avenue materials accessed on 13 June 2016.
"WILSON, William Hasell, railroad pres.- eng'r; b. Charleston, S. C., 5 November 1811; ed. there and Philadelphia; in service State of Pa. In eng'r corps, chairman to principal asst. eng'r, 1827–34; m., 26 April 1836, Jane Millers, of Delaware Co., Pa., (died. 11 May 1898). Principal asst. eng'r Philadelphia & Reading R. R.. 1835-8; in general engineering practice, 1838–57; resident eng'r Pa. R. R., 1857–62; chief eng'r. 1862–74; organized real estate dept. and was at its head, 1874–84; since then pres. and director of several companies whose roads are leased by Pa. R. R. Co. Residence: 3501 Powelton Av.. Office: Pennsylvania R. 11. Office, Broad St., Philadelphia".
(Who's Who in America. John William Leonard, Albert Nelson Marquis.  1899–1900.  .)
Obituary for Wilson in Philadelphia Inquirer, 19 August 1902.
"The death of W. Hasell Wilson, for many years president; of the Pennsylvania Railroad's Belvidere division, occurred yesterday at his residence, 3501 Powelton avenue. He was ninety-one years of age and has been suffering from general debility for two months, during which time he has been absent from business. He was born in Charleston, S. C., accompanied by his father, Major John Wilson, in locating the Philadelphia and Columbia Railroad in 1828, entered the service of the Pennsylvania in 1836 and became resident engineer for the entire line in 1859. In 1873 he became president of the Erie and subsequently of other railroads, continuing till 1894, when he resigned all but the presidency of the Belvidere division. He leaves one son, Henry W. Wilson, an architect, and three daughters, Mrs. William A. Baldwin, Miss Sarah H. Wilson, and Miss Susan D. Wilson".
 Historical Society of Pennsylvania Collections of Wilson materials
725A Wilson, William Hasell, 1811–1902. Papers, 1706–1900.
725B, Wilson, William Hasell, 1811–1902. Papers, 1855 (1889–1896) 1898. (11 items)

1811 births
1902 deaths
American people in rail transportation
American civil engineers
Pennsylvania Railroad people